Miodrag Radovanović (: 20 August 1929 – 15 January 2019) was a Serbian actor. He appeared in more than one hundred films since 1957. He won the Golden Arena Award for Best Supporting Actor for his role in Salaš u Malom Ritu.

Selected filmography

References

External links

1929 births
2019 deaths
People from Čačak
Serbian male film actors